The Musical instruments of Rajasthan include:

 Ravanahatta
 Kamaicha
 Sindhi Sarangi
 Morsing
 Algoze
 NaagPhani
 Ghara
 Jantar
 Chikara
 Ektara
 Murali
 Gujari
 Dheru
 Bhapang
 Khartal

Raavan Hatha
Raavan Hatha, or 'Raavan's Hand' is a string instrument modelled from a legend telling the story of  Raavan came upon his death by Lord Rama in Sri Lanka. Fifteen metallic pegs run along the stem of the instrument representing Raavan's fifteen fingers. The two wooden pegs behind the stem represent his thumbs. The coconut base represents the shoulder and the strings represent the nerves.

Kamaicha
The seventeen-string kamaicha, or khamaycha, is a string instrument constructed out of a piece of mango wood, featuring a round resonator covered in goat leather. 

Three of its strings are made of goat intestine, while the other fourteen are made of steel. It is one of the oldest string instruments in the world played with a bow. It is a key presence in Rajasthani folk music.

References of

Indian musical instruments
Rajasthani culture